Gazole Mahavidyalaya is a college in Gazole Town in the Malda district of West Bengal, India. The college is affiliated to the University of Gour Banga,  offering undergraduate courses.  It was established on 1 August 2006

Location
Gazole Mahavidyalaya is located just a stone-throw-distance from National Highway 34 towards west at Gazole Town, on the northern part of Malda. It is very near to Pandua and the Adina Mosque which are attractive tourist location. Gazole is well-connected by both road and railways. Since the college is located in an open field surrounded by greenery, the environment is calm and quiet and completely pollution-free. The class rooms are large, well-lit and provides a very healthy environment.

Administration 
The college has a dynamic administrative system under the supervision of the Administrator. All academic and non academic activities are being coordinated and administrated by the Principal of this college with the help of different departments.

Departments

Arts 
Arabic
Bengali
English
Education
Geography
History
Political Science
Philosophy
Sociology
Sanskrit

See also

References

External links

University of Gour Banga
University Grants Commission
National Assessment and Accreditation Council

Colleges affiliated to University of Gour Banga
Universities and colleges in Malda district
Educational institutions established in 2006
2006 establishments in West Bengal